60 Herculis is a single star located 134 light years away from the Sun in the northern constellation of Hercules, and is positioned just seven degrees away from Rasalgethi (Alpha Herculis). It is visible to the naked eye as a faint, white-hued star with an apparent visual magnitude of 4.871. This star is moving closer to the Earth with a heliocentric radial velocity of −4 km/s.

Abt and Morrell (1995) assigned this star a stellar classification of A3V, matching an ordinary A-type main-sequence star. However, earlier studies gave it a luminosity class of IV, which suggested it is a subdwarf star. It has a projected rotational velocity of 117 km/s, which is creating an equatorial bulge that is 5% larger than the star's polar radius. The star is 327 million years old with 1.9 times the Sun's mass. It is radiating 17 times the luminosity of the Sun from its photosphere at an effective temperature of 8,299 K.

References

A-type main-sequence stars
Hercules (constellation)
Durchmusterung objects
Herculis, 060
154494
083613
6355